Events from the year 1999 in Taiwan, Republic of China. This year is numbered Minguo 88 according to the official Republic of China calendar.

Incumbents
 President – Lee Teng-hui
 Vice President – Lien Chan
 Premier – Vincent Siew
 Vice Premier – Liu Chao-shiuan

Events

April
 15 April – 2000 Democratic Progressive Party presidential primary.
 20–25 April – 1999 Asian Youth Boys Volleyball Championship in Chiayi City.

May
 8–9 May – Resolution on Taiwan's Future was ratified by Democratic Progressive Party in Kaohsiung.

June
 10 June – The establishment of Miaoli Railway Museum in Miaoli City, Miaoli County.

July
 1 July – The establishment of Centers for Disease Control.
 8 July – The 'special state-to-state' model for cross-strait relations proposed by President Lee Teng-hui.

August
 24 August – The explosion of Uni Air Flight 873 after it landed at Hualien Airport.

September
 10 September – The signing of A New Partnership Between the Indigenous Peoples and the Government of Taiwan in Taitung County.
 21 September – The 7.6  Jiji earthquake occurred in Nantou County.

October
 25 October – The opening of Hong-gah Museum in Beitou District, Taipei.

November
 11 November – The opening of Xindian Line of Taipei Metro.

December
 12 December – 36th Golden Horse Awards in Taipei.
 24 December – The opening of Nangang Line of Taipei Metro.

Births
 2 April – Hsu Yu-hsiou, tennis player
 14 June – Chou Tzu-yu, singer

Deaths
 30 November – Huang Hsin-chieh, 71, Taiwanese politician, MLY (1969–1991), heart attack. 
 28 December – , 65, Taiwanese democracy activist.

References

 
Years of the 20th century in Taiwan